Heptagenia solitaria is a species of flatheaded mayfly in the family Heptageniidae. It is found in southwestern, northern Canada, and the western United States.

References

Mayflies
Articles created by Qbugbot
Insects described in 1924